Gaziantepspor A2 is the under-20 squad of Gaziantepspor They play in the Turkish A2 league, along with fellow A2 teams from other clubs. 2019-20 season, the club withdrew in the Amateur League with -15 points and finished the league in the last place and Gaziantepspor together with went bankrupt and closed its activities.

A2 squad

Honours
PAF League
Runners-up (2): 2004–05, 2005–06

A2
A2 Ligi clubs